St Elli's Church may refer to two churches in Wales.

 St Elli Church, Llanelli, Carmarthenshire
 St Elli's Church, Llanelly, Monmouthshire